= Xpat Magazine =

Arts and culture publication published in Taiwan

Xpat Magazine was a quarterly all-English arts and culture publication based in Tainan, Taiwan. Xpat Magazine was founded by Matt Gibson as an e-zine in February 2003. Gibson edited and managed the magazine until he sold it to a group of expatriates in September, 2007.

Xpat Magazine published various creative and journalistic writings by Taiwan's expatriate community, and was most noted for its coverage of obscure Taiwanese traditions and cultural practices and directory of English-speaking businesses in Taiwan and its emphasis on photojournalism.

The first print edition of Xpat Magazine was launched in December 2003. It was distributed free in foreign business Taiwan-wide. Print editions of the magazine were published quarterly from December 2004 until the December 2008 when the publication reverted to e-zine format.

Staff photographers for Xpat Magazine included Chris Scott, Richard Matheson, Pawl English and Steven Vigar.
